The 1986 Champions Trophy was held in Sharjah, UAE, between November 27 and December 5, 1986. Four national teams took part: India, Pakistan, Sri Lanka and West Indies.

The 1986 Champions Trophy was a round-robin tournament where each team played the other once in a tournament worth £60,000 in prize money. West Indies won all three of its matches, winning the trophy and UK£22,000.

Matches

Table

See also
 Sharjah Cup

References

 
 Cricket Archive: Champions Trophy 1986/87
 ESPNCricinfo: Champions Trophy, 1986/87
 

International cricket competitions from 1985–86 to 1988
Champions Trophy, 1986
1986 in Emirati sport
International cricket competitions in the United Arab Emirates